Reznikov is a Slavic and Jewish masculine surname. Its feminine counterpart is Reznikova. Notable people with the surname include:

 Alexander Reznikov (1960 Kyiv–2003), Russian mathematician (Geometry)
 Hanon Reznikov (1950–2008), American actor and writer
 Nikol Reznikov (born 1999), Israeli model and beauty pageant
 Oleksii Reznikov (born 1966), Ukrainian politician
 Patricia Reznikov (born 1962), Franco-American writer
 Stanislav Reznikov (born 1986), Russian footballer
 Viktor Reznikov (1952–1992), Russian composer, lyricist and singer
 Vladimir Reznikov (died 1986), Russian-American gangster
 Galina "Red" Reznikov, a character from the Netflix series Orange Is the New Black

See also 
 Reznik

Russian-language surnames